The Attacks on Likoshan and Qirez were large-scale police attacks that took place at the onset of the Kosovo War in the villages of Likoshan and Qirez.

On 28 February 1998, the Kosovo Liberation Army (KLA) ambushed a unit of the Serbian police near Likoshan, killing four and seriously wounding two policemen. This prompted large-scale police operations in the villages of Likoshan and Qirez in the following day, leading to the killing of 4 KLA members and 26 Kosovo Albanian civilians in both villages. The attack on Likoshan and Qirez was followed by the Attack on Prekaz on the following days. The attacks on Likoshan and Qirez, as well as Prekaz, marked the beginning of the Kosovo War.

Background

According to HRW (1998)
On 28 February 1998, according to Serbian police, armed Albanians attacked a police patrol near the village of Likoshan, killing four policemen and seriously wounding two. A pro-government report told that there were three simultaneous attacks on police patrols. Albanians from Likoshan informed the Human Rights Watch (HRW) that they heard shooting near the village around 11 PM, and some heard that the police had been ambushed there. Unconfirmed reports tell that armed Albanians attacked the police-based ammunition plant near Donji Prekaz on 27 February and that the police were ambushed at Likoshan after a police chase.

According to AI (1999)
Albanian witnesses stated that events began on the evening of 27 February, "when the KLA fired at a school housing Bosnian or Croatian Serb refugees in the nearby town of Srbica". According to Amnesty International:

Events

Likoshan

The police arrived at Likoshan between 11:30 AM and 12 PM, with a hovering police helicopter and many APCs and armed special police surrounding the house of the Ahmeti family. The family was the richest one in the village. Villagers told HRW that there were no KLA members present, though it is possible that shots were fired at the police.

In a quick and well-organized manner, suggesting that the attack was planned, the special police focused on two neighboring households, of the Gjeli and Ahmeti families. There are speculations over whether a KLA member entered and left the Ahmeti house. At ca. 3:30 PM, the police broke into the Ahmeti compound. Ten male members of the family, and a guest, aged between 16 and 50, were beaten and then extrajudicially executed.

The only Ahmeti brother to survive was away at the time, returning to Likoshan after hearing of the incident; according to him, as told to HRW, when he arrived at 8 AM on 1 March, looking from a hill, he saw "an APC in our compound and another outside. A third was behind. There was artillery all over and the police were shooting everywhere". According to him the police left 3:30 PM, he then went to his house and was told that ten male family members and a guest had been taken into custody. He also told HRW that furniture had been destroyed and valuables were stolen.

The Ahmeti family learned of the death of their men the next day, when a neighbor, of the Gjeli family, saw their bodies at the morgue while collecting the bodies of his two killed family members. On 3 March the bodies were buried, along with 15 other victims from Likoshan and Qirez. An American journalist told HRW that the Ahmeti bodies had clear signs of torture.

Qirez

According to those present at that time, the Serbian Police arrived at 12:30 PM after shooting 6 oak logs. Witnesses told the HRW that seven APC's, along with one helicopter shooting down on rooftops, were present at the village. They first went up to the Nebihu family. They killed Rubika Nebihu, a 27 year-old woman who was seven months pregnant. They also killed the eldest son, Xhemsil. Sefer Nebihu, the father, told the HRW:

Another family to be attacked by the Serbian Police was the Sejdiu family. Four sons of the Sejdiu family were killed in Qirez, those being Bekim, Nazmi, Bedri, and Beqir. Abdia Sejdiu, the mother of the household, told HRW:

All 26 people killed in Likoshan and Qirez were buried in a field nearby the two villages. An estimated 30,000 people attended the ceremony. Police checkpoints on the major road prohibited more from joining.

Nataša Kandić's accusations
Nataša Kandić of Belgrade's Humanitarian Law Center, accused Danica Marinković, formerly investigating judge of the Pristina District Court, of being responsible for the murders of the Ahmeti family. Kandić stated that some former Serbian policemen witnessed that "Danica Marinković personally ordered several wounded members of the Ahmeti family to be shot on 28 February 1998 in the village of Likoshan". According to the allegations, Marinković came, as an investigating judge, to conduct an on-site investigation. There was a pile of bodies outside the Ahmeti house in which some men were still giving signs of life. In the presence of about 30 members of the Special Anti-Terrorism Unit of Yugoslavia, she allegedly said: "I'm not taking them - kill them" and the men were executed with a Heckler weapon. In response, Marinković accused Kandić of lying.

Aftermath

The Attack on Prekaz, also known as the Prekaz massacre, was an operation led by the Special Anti-Terrorism Unit of Serbia on 5 March 1998, to capture Kosovo Liberation Army (KLA) fighters deemed terrorists by Serbia. During the operation, KLA leader Adem Jashari and his brother Hamëz were killed, along with nearly 60 other family members.

The attack was criticized by Amnesty International, which wrote in its report that: "all evidence suggests that the attack was not intended to apprehend armed Albanians, but to eliminate the suspects and their families." Serbia, on the other hand, claimed the raid was due to KLA attacks on police outposts.

See also
 War crimes in the Kosovo War
 List of massacres in the Kosovo War

References

Sources

External links

Serbian war crimes in the Kosovo War
Massacres in the Kosovo War
Military operations of the Kosovo War
Battles involving FR Yugoslavia
Mass murder in 1998
1998 in Kosovo
February 1998 events in Europe
March 1998 events in Europe